Amzya (Ämzä) is a rural locality (a selo) in Neftekamsk, Bashkortostan, Russia. The population was 4,993 as of 2010. There are 67 streets.

Geography 
Amzya is located 22 km northeast of Neftekamsk. Kumovo is the nearest rural locality.

References 

Rural localities in Neftekamsk urban okrug